Paul Kipsiele Koech (born 10 November 1981) is a Kenyan runner who specializes in the 3000 metres steeplechase. He won the 2004 Olympic bronze medal in this event. His personal best of 7:54.31 minutes is the third fastest of all time.

He was born in 1981 in Kapchepkoro, near Sotik town, Sotik District. He graduated from Cheplanget Secondary School in 1999. He did well at the National Cross Country Championships and was subsequently invited to compete in Europe and joined a team managed by James Templeton.

Despite being among the fastest steeplechasers, he has failed several times at the Kenyan trials for World championships or Olympics. He competed at the all seven IAAF World Athletics Final meetings, finishing every time in the top three, being the only athlete to achieve it.

He has had success in cross country running, with wins at the Cinque Mulini (2006) and the Iris Lotto Cross Cup (2007) to his name. He holds the steeplechase meet record for the Prefontaine Classic, Adidas Grand Prix, and DN Galan.

He has built a primary school near his home. He also trains some younger runners, including World junior champion Mercy Cherono. Koech is married and has a daughter born in 2004 and a younger son.

In February 2010 he set a world best of 5:17.04 in the rarely competed 2000 m indoor steeplechase. He won twice in the 2010 Diamond League and finished with enough points to become the inaugural steeplechase Diamond Trophy winner. He improved his indoor 2000 m steeplechase record to 5:13.77 at the Indoor Flanders Meeting in February 2011.

At the Rome Diamond League event in May Koech set a new personal best of 7:54.31, the third fastest time ever for the 3000 metre steeplechase. Despite this performance, he did not perform well in the altitude of the Kenyan Olympic trials and finished outside of the top five.

Achievements

Personal bests
1500 metres – 3:37.92 (2007)
3000 metres – 7:33.93 (2005)
Two miles – 8:13.31 (2008) 	
5000 metres – 13:05.18 (2010)
3000 metres steeplechase – 7:54.31 (2012)
Half Marathon - 1:01:03 (2017)
Marathon - 2:12:02 (2017)

References

External links
 Official website



1981 births
Living people
Kenyan male steeplechase runners
Kenyan male long-distance runners
Kenyan male middle-distance runners
Athletes (track and field) at the 2004 Summer Olympics
Olympic athletes of Kenya
Olympic bronze medalists for Kenya
People from Kericho County
Olympic bronze medalists in athletics (track and field)
African Games silver medalists for Kenya
African Games medalists in athletics (track and field)
Athletes (track and field) at the 2003 All-Africa Games
Diamond League winners
Medalists at the 2004 Summer Olympics